Matveyev (masculine) or Matveyeva (feminine) is a Russian language family name. Its alternative spellings include Matveev. The name is derived from the male given name Matvey and literally means Matvey's. It may refer to:

Aleksandr Matveyev (disambiguation) 
Aleksandr Matveyev (linguist) (1926–2010), Russian linguist
Aleksandr Matveyev (medic), Russian medic
Aleksandr Matveyev (officer) (1922–?), Soviet army officer and Full Cavalier of the Order of Glory
Aleksandr Matveyev (sculptor) (1878–1960), Russian sculptor
Andrey Matveyev (1666–1728), Russian statesman
Andrey Matveyev (painter) (1702–1739), Russian painter
Artamon Matveyev (1625–1682), Russian statesman, diplomat and reformer
Boris Matveyev (percussionist) (1928–?), Russian percussionist
Boris Matveyev (zoologist) (1889–1973), Soviet zoologist
Boris Matveyev (footballer) (b. 1970), Soviet and Russian footballer
Fyodor Matveyev (1758–1826), Russian painter and graphic artist
Ivan Matveyev (1890–1918), participant of the Russian Civil War
Kyrylo Matveyev (b. 1996), Ukrainian footballer
Mikhail Matveyev (1914–1944), Soviet aircraft pilot and Hero of the Soviet Union
Oleh Matveyev (b. 1970), Russian-born Ukrainian footballer
Novella Matveyeva (1934–2016), Russian bard
Pavel Matveyev (b. 1980), Russian artist
Svetlana Matveeva (b. 1969), Russian chess player
Tatiana Matveyeva (b. 1985), Russian weightlifter
Tatiana Matveeva (footballer), Georgian football player
Vladimir Matveyev (1911–1942), Soviet aircraft pilot and Hero of the Soviet Union
Yevgeny Matveyev (1922–2003), Soviet and Russian actor, film director and screenwriter

See also
Matveev Kurgan, a rural locality (a settlement) in Rostov Oblast, Russia

Russian-language surnames
Patronymic surnames
Surnames from given names